The Oprişeneşti oil field is an oil field located in Ianca, Brăila County. It was discovered in 1958 and developed by Petrom. It began production in 1960 and produces oil.

References

Oil fields in Romania